John Joseph Loftus (born February 12, 1950), is an American author, former high level U.S. government prosecutor and former Army intelligence officer. He is the president of The Intelligence Summit and of the Florida Holocaust Museum in St. Petersburg.  

Loftus is an author of numerous books on a purported CIA-Nazi connection including The Belarus Secret and The Secret War Against the Jews, both of which contain material claiming a Bush-Rockefeller-Nazi connection.

He currently writes a weekly column called "spyview" for the Ultra-Orthodox Jewish magazine Ami.

Early career
Son of a firefighter, Loftus was born in Boston, Massachusetts and is a graduate of Boston College (BA, 1971) and Suffolk University (JD, 1977). He served in the U.S. Army from 1971 to 1974, attaining the rank of First Lieutenant. He began working for the US Department of Justice in 1977 and in 1979 joined their Office of Special Investigations, which was charged with prosecuting and deporting Nazi war criminals in the US. Loftus' now-expired website claimed, "As a young U.S. Army officer, John Loftus helped train Israelis on a covert operation that turned the tide of battle in the 1973 Yom Kippur War."

Author

Loftus is the author and co-author of several books on Nazis, espionage, and similar topics including The Belarus Secret (1982), Unholy Trinity: How the Vatican's Nazi Networks Betrayed Western Intelligence to the Soviets (1992), The Secret War Against the Jews: How Western Espionage Betrayed the Jewish People (1994), Unholy Trinity: The Vatican, the Nazis, and the Swiss Banks (1998), America's Nazi Secret: An Insider's History of How the United States Department of Justice Obstructed Congress by: Blocking Congressional Investigations into Famous American Families Who Funded Hitler, Stalin and Arab Terrorists (2010). Although Loftus' first book, The Belarus Secret, is nonfiction, it was adapted into a TV movie, Kojak: The Belarus File (1985), with Telly Savalas.

Reception of The Belarus Secret 
The Office of Special Investigations historian David Marwell described Loftus' book The Belarus Secret as "the worst kind of amateur history." Vital Zayka, a fellow of the Center for Jewish History in New York City, accused Loftus of falsification. The Israeli historian and Nazi hunter Efraim Zuroff described the book as controversial and referred to Charles R. Allen Jr.'s review in Jewish Currents, in which Allen joined the active criticism of Loftus and named him a fraud and a liar.

What Loftus had described as the Belarus secret is that many of the Belarus Brigade's leaders, a unit incorporated into a German SS division, were assisted into the United States after World War II – thanks largely to the efforts of Frank Wisner. In defiance of federal law, Loftus asserted, the Office of Policy Coordination helped obtain visas for Nazi collaborators from Belarus — who were believed to have facilitated numerous atrocities by the Nazi Germany. According to Loftus, it was all part of a Cold War scheme to wage guerrilla warfare in Soviet-occupied Europe, in which the Nazi collaborators were to play a key role. When the project collapsed, however, the Belarusians quickly settled in and obtained US citizenship – and intelligence agencies protected them from exposure for decades.

The New York Times wrote: "there is a question as to whether the author in his zealousness may not have overstated some of his material. He says 300 Byelorussian Nazis and an 'even larger number of Ukrainian Nazis' were smuggled in. But he fails to draw a distinction between documented war criminals and hangers-on and perhaps other less culpable collaborators. ... Still, The Belarus Secret is certain to be a valuable source book when Congress reopens hearings ... into allegations of a war criminal cover-up."

Radio talk show host
Loftus previously had a radio show on Talkline Communications Network broadcast live every Monday and Tuesday from 11 pm to midnight EST in New York City, northern New Jersey, southern Connecticut, and Miami and Pompano Beach, Florida. His co-host was John Batchelor.

Social critic
Loftus serves as a media commentator, appearing regularly on ABC National Radio and Fox News. He also writes weekly for Ami, an Orthodox Jewish weekly newsmagazine.

On August 7, 2005, he provided the United States address of an alleged terrorist named Iyad K. Hilal on Fox News. Only afterwards was it revealed that Hilal had left the address three years previously and the home was now owned by a family, who was then subjected to threats and vandalism and required police protection as a result of Loftus' words. Fox terminated Loftus's contract to commentate after the event. Loftus said "I thought it might help police in that area now that we have positively identified a terrorist," but he did not say why he did not contact police in a more direct manner. Loftus apologized for the mistake and expressed frustration about "one federal [agency's]" inaction on an earlier tip he had given them years ago due to the same address.

Selected publications 
   Revised and expanded as 
 
  Also published as  Released in a new and revised edition as

See also
 Dave Emory

References

External links
 Unofficial Audio Archive of The John Batchelor Show and The Loftus Report commenced February 18, 2008
 Muslim Brotherhood, (Bana) Nazis And Al Qaeda
  with Leon Charney on The Leon Charney Report

1950 births
Living people
American radio personalities
American male writers
Boston College alumni
Writers from Boston
United States Department of Justice lawyers
United States Army officers